Puyo Puyo Champions ( in Japan), is a puzzle video game developed by Sonic Team and published by Sega for the Nintendo Switch, Xbox One, PlayStation 4, and in 2019 for Microsoft Windows (through the Steam platform).

Released in Japan under the name Puyo Puyo eSports, the game was localized for international release in 2019 under the name Puyo Puyo Champions. As with Puyo Puyo Tetris, the international release features English characters voices, allowing the player to change between the original Japanese and the English localized voices; the game interface is also available in French, German, Italian, Spanish, Traditional Chinese, Simplified Chinese and Korean.

Gameplay 
The game features two separate gameplay rules based on the earlier games:

 Puyo Puyo Tsu
 Puyo Puyo Fever

The game modes available include:

 Multiplayer, the main focus of the game; can be played locally on the same device or via LAN, or with other players online, casually or competitively
 Tournament, a local multiplayer mode for up to eight players, featuring a single-elimination tournament
 Lessons, a single-player mode for learning the basics of the game and training
 Challenges, the only other single-player mode available, mainly to test players' skills and abilities

As its Japanese title implies, this game is aimed at eSports and thus focuses on competitive multiplayer, so it lacks the single player campaign prominently featured in the previous games.

Puyo Puyo Champions also features 24 playable characters, complete with their own distinct AI behavior and Fever drop pattern, though some of these characters simply reuse the existing AI of characters not appearing in the game as playable. These characters include fan-favorites from the original Compile game series such as Arle Nadja and Dark Prince, as well as newer characters such as Ally, who debuted in the Japan-only Nintendo 3DS game Puyo Puyo Chronicle. The 2.02 update, released on August 24, 2020, added two hidden characters, Rafisol and Paprisu, both of which can be selected by inputting specific button combinations while selecting character.

The game also allows players to personalize their in-game profile image, with over a hundred characters to choose from both the main game series and Puyopuyo!! Quest, as well as a selection of backgrounds and borders, all of which seem to be carried over from Puyopuyo!! Quest.

Reception 

The game received mostly favorable reviews. The Nintendo Switch version received a score of 74/100 at Metacritic, based on 10 reviews, while the PlayStation 4 one received a score of 74/100, based on 4 reviews.

Nintendo Life says that Puyo Puyo Champions ably covers the essentials of the series at a great price point, leaving a score of 80/100.

References

External links 

 Official website (English)
 Official website (Japanese)

2018 video games
Nintendo Switch games
PlayStation 4 games
Puyo Puyo
Sega arcade games
Sega video games
Sonic Team games
Windows games
Xbox One games
Video games developed in Japan
Multiplayer and single-player video games